Lion Air Flight 904 was a scheduled domestic passenger flight from Husein Sastranegara International Airport in Bandung to Ngurah Rai International Airport in Bali, Indonesia. On April 13, 2013, the Boeing 737-800 operating the flight crashed into water short of the runway while on final approach to land. All 101 passengers and 7 crew on board survived the accident. At 3:10 pm, the aircraft crashed approximately  short of the seawall protecting the threshold of Runway 09. The aircraft's fuselage broke into two and 46 people were injured, 4 of them seriously.

Among the findings contained in the final investigation report was that the crew continued the approach in adverse weather conditions beyond the point at which the approved procedure would have required to abort the landing. The subsequent attempt to go around was made too late to avoid the impact with the sea. There were no issues with the aircraft and all systems were operating normally.

Aircraft

The Boeing 737-8GP, registration PK-LKS, was owned by leasing company Avolon. It was received new from Boeing by Lion Air's subsidiary Malindo Air less than two months before the accident, on February 21, 2013. It was then transferred to parent Lion Air in March. The aircraft had been in service for less than six weeks with Lion Air before the accident. At the time of the accident, Lion Air had 16 other Boeing 737-800 in the fleet.

Crew and passengers
There were two pilots and 5 flight attendants with 101 passengers on board consisting of 95 adults, 5 children and 1 infant. 97 passengers were Indonesians, one French, one Belgian, and two Singaporeans. 6 of the crew were Indonesian while one came from India.

The captain was 48-year-old Mahlup Ghazali, an Indonesian national who joined Lion Air in 2013 and had logged 15,000 hours of flight experience, including 6,173 hours on the Boeing 737. The first officer was 24-year-old Chirag Kalra, an Indian national who had 1,200 flight hours, with 973 of them on the Boeing 737.

Investigation
The Indonesian National Transportation Safety Committee (NTSC) published a preliminary report on 15 May 2013. Flight data showed that the aircraft continued to descend below the Minimum descent altitude (MDA), which is  AGL. The report found that at  AGL, the first officer reported that the runway was not in sight. At approximately  AGL, the pilot again stated he could not see the runway. Flight data showed that the pilots attempted to perform a go-around at approximately  AGL, but contacted the water surface moments later. The captain's go around decision came far too late. The bare minimum altitude for a 737 go around is 15 m, as 9 m of altitude is lost when executing the manoeuvre.  There has been no indication that the aircraft suffered any mechanical malfunction.  A final report was published in 2014.

In January 2017, Budi Waseso, the chief of Indonesia's national narcotics agency, said that the pilot of Lion Air Flight 904 was under the influence of drugs at the time of the accident, and had hallucinated that the sea was part of the runway. That claim is at odds with the statement made after the accident by Indonesia's transport ministry, which said the pilots had not tested positive for drugs.

The NTSC concluded that the flight path became unstable below minimum descent altitude with the rate of descent exceeding 1000 feet per minute. Analysis of the pitch angle versus engine power based on the flight data recorder "indicated that the basic principle of jet aircraft flying was not adhered during manual flying."
The flight crew lost situational awareness and visual references as the aircraft entered a rain cloud during the final approach below minimum descent altitude. The Captain's go-around decision and execution was conducted at an altitude which was insufficient for it to be executed successfully. The pilots were not provided with timely and accurate weather information considering the weather around the airport and particularly on final approach was changing rapidly.

See also
 Air Niugini Flight 73 – A Boeing 737 that crashed in similar circumstances in 2018
 Japan Airlines Flight 2 – A DC-8 that crashed in San Francisco Bay in 1968
 Miami Air International Flight 293 – A Boeing 737 that crashed in a storm in 2019

References

2013 in Indonesia
904
Aviation accidents and incidents in 2013
Aviation accidents and incidents in Indonesia
Accidents and incidents involving the Boeing 737 Next Generation
April 2013 events in Asia
Airliner accidents and incidents involving ditching